Malabar – Sri Lanka Portuguese is a Glottolog classification that includes:

Malabar Indo-Portuguese or Cochin Portuguese creole, formerly spoken on the Malabar coast of India
Sri Lankan Portuguese creole

References 

Glottolog languages that correspond to more than one Wikipedia article